Junior Pericles Pinto Catarina (born 4 November 1989 in Rio de Janeiro), commonly known as Pericles, is a Brazilian footballer who currently plays as an attacking midfielder for Adriatiku Mamurrasi, on loan from FK Kukësi in the Albanian Superliga.

References

1989 births
Living people
Brazilian footballers
Brazilian expatriate footballers
Brazilian expatriate sportspeople in Albania
Expatriate footballers in Albania
FK Kukësi players
Kategoria Superiore players
Association football midfielders
Footballers from Rio de Janeiro (city)